Gustave Botiaux (born 14 July 1926 in Puteaux) is a French tenor.

Life and career

Botiaux was a winner of the 1954 Cannes tenor competition and sang at the Théâtre Royal de la Monnaie in Brussels in the 1955-56 season. He then very moved to the Opéra Garnier where he held the first roles for several years, as well as at the Salle Favart.

His vocal timbre and athletic physique led him to perform in many theatres in France and abroad, where roles included Samson, Radames, Lohengrin, Roméo, Faust, Don José, Werther, Julien in Louise, Mario in Tosca, the Duke of Mantua (in Rigoletto), Turiddu and Pinkerton. At this time at the Opéra-Comique the frequent programming of Cavalleria Rusticana and Pagliacci allowed Botiaux to shine in this double-bill. His reputation in these roles during the 1960s spread to Japan and the USSR.

The French provincial opera houses gave him two of his most noted roles: Vasco de Gama in L'Africaine by Meyerbeer, and Sigurd role in the eponymous opera by Reyer. In the same period, he was also involved in the French-language revival of La fanciulla del West by Puccini, a work little represented in French-speaking countries at the time. He also appeared at major summer festivals, particularly at the Chorégies d'Orange and the Arena of Nîmes in the role of Jean in Hérodiade.

A period of ill health led him to a break in his career from 1964 to 1968. He resumed in Hérodiade in Aix-en-Provence, and re-joined the RTLN troupe until 1973. There he undertook the role of Canio in Pagliacci, and, outside his normal repertoire, Alfred in La Chauve-Souris by Johann Strauss. He also continued his career in the provinces, notably with many performances of Rigoletto, Carmen, and Tosca. In 1973, he retired from the stage. 

He is married to soprano Jacqueline Silvy.

Recordings 
In the 1960s, he recorded four recitals of operatic arias as well as some extracts from Faust, Carmen, The Land of Smiles, Tosca, and Sigurd.

References

External links 
 Boteaux Gustave on Art Lyrique
 Gustave Botiaux (Tosca) le ciel luisait d'étoiles on YouTube

1926 births
Living people
People from Puteaux
French operatic tenors